Beijing Antique Market, also known as The Dirt Market, is Beijing's largest and best-known arts, crafts, and antiques market, located in Panjiayuan Subdistrict, Chaoyang District, Beijing. Its Chinese name is Panjiayuan Antique Market.

Name 

In Chinese, it is called "Panjiayuan". Another English name is "Beijing Curio Market".

Location 

It is located in south east Beijing, near the Panjiayuan Bridge, East 3rd Ring Road South, Chaoyang District. It covers an area of 48,500 square meters, of which 26,000 square meters are for business.
There are over 4,000 shops in the market, with nearly 10,000 dealers.

Layout

The market is divided into five parts:

 Buddhism Statues Area. in the western part of the market, it is an open-air area where large stone sculptures are sold out of trucks.
 Antique Furniture Area. Next to the Buddhism Statues Area, two-storied building that houses traditional furniture and Cultural Revolution articles.
 "High-rank" Antique Store Area. 
 Books and Scrolls Area. a narrow lane in the south where secondhand books and ancient scrolls are sold.
 Middle Area. a semi-covered area that forms the main part of the market. This is open only at the weekends.

Middle Area has four zones:

 Zone One. Chinese paintings, calligraphic works as well as beads and jade.
 Zone Two. beads, bronze vessels, ceramic vases and small wooden furniture.
 Zone Three. Chinese ethnic minority arts and crafts, trinkets, antiques and apparel. Many of these traders are from Tibet.
 Zone Four. Chinese ceramics

On weekends the number of customers reaches 60,000~70,000 a day, including over 10,000 foreigners. Dozens of important foreign politicians, such as Hillary Clinton, Speaker of the U.S. House of Representatives Dennis Hastert, Greek Prime Minister Costas Simitis, Romanian Prime Minister Nastase, Sri Lankan President Chandrika Kumaratunga, and Thai Princess Sirindhorn have visited the market.

Products sold at the market include: snuff bottles made in Hengshui, Yangliuqing New Year paintings, embroidery made in Jiangsu, wood carvings from Dongyang, stone carvings from Quyang, shadow play paraphernalia from Shandong, porcelain and crystal ornaments from Jiangxi, boccaro wares from Yixing, bronze wares from Shaanxi, costumes from Yunnan, Tibetan Buddhist articles, white jade from Xinjiang, and Jiaozhi pottery from Taiwan. These folk handicrafts are gathered in the market before being distributed all over the world.

Not all the antiques are genuine, so if one needs certainty, then it is best to shop elsewhere.

History 

This spontaneous market came into being in 1992 as a roadside market. As trade in folk antiques and handiwork grew, it had become a large antique and handiwork market spreading folk culture in 2002. Many Chinese antique collectors believe that they started their career in Panjiayuan.

In 2004, at the prize-awarding ceremony of the first Annual Top Ten Lists of Collection in China, the market was elected one of the top ten antique markets in China.

Opening hours

8:30 - 18:30 from Monday to Friday
4:30 - 18:30 Saturday and Sunday

See also
Chinese art
Silk Street

References

External links
 Ron Gluckman, Beijing's Dirt (cheap) Market
 Ron Gluckman, Re-Made in China

Retail markets in Beijing
Tourist attractions in Beijing
Buildings and structures in Chaoyang District, Beijing